This Man in Paris is a 1939 British comedy mystery film directed by David MacDonald and starring Barry K. Barnes, Valerie Hobson and Alastair Sim.

It was a sequel to the 1938 film This Man Is News. It was made at Denham Studios.

Premise
A British journalist and his wife travel to France to investigate a counterfeiting ring involving a British aristocrat.

Cast
 Barry K. Barnes as Simon Drake
 Valerie Hobson as Pat Drake
 Alastair Sim as Lochlan Macgregor
 Edward Lexy as Holly
 Garry Marsh as Sergeant Bright
 Max Michel as Emile Beranger
 Mona Goya as Torch Bernal
 Anthony Shaw as General Craysham
 Cyril Chamberlain as Swindon
 Charles Oliver as Gaston
  Paul Sheridan as reception clerk

Critical reception
TV Guide gave the film two out of four stars, and wrote, "this well-done, clever comedy was a follow-up film to This Man is News, a British attempt to duplicate America's THIN MAN. However, this second film proved to be the last effort along those lines. Hobson is excellent in her role, though Barnes isn't quite the character he tries to be. Sim provides good comic support in another one of his eccentric specialties. Director MacDonald wins huzzahs for another entertaining middle-bracket crime story."

References

External links

1939 films
British comedy mystery films
1930s comedy mystery films
Films produced by Anthony Havelock-Allan
Films set in Paris
Films shot at Denham Film Studios
British black-and-white films
1939 comedy films
1930s English-language films
1930s British films